All the Way is an album by American singer Frank Sinatra, released in 1961.

The fourth Capitol compilation album of singles and B-sides from 1957 to 1960. Capitol released All the Way on compact disc briefly in 1988, before discontinuing it in the early 1990s. All tracks are available on The Complete Capitol Singles Collection box set.

Track listing
"All the Way" (Sammy Cahn, Jimmy Van Heusen) – 2:55
"High Hopes" (Cahn, Van Heusen) – 2:43
"Talk to Me" (Eddie Snyder, Stanley Kahan, Rudy Vallee) – 3:04
"French Foreign Legion" (Aaron Schroeder, Guy Wood) – 2:03
"To Love and Be Loved" (Cahn, Van Heusen) – 3:53
"River, Stay 'Way from My Door" (Harry M. Woods, Mort Dixon) – 2:39
"Witchcraft" (Cy Coleman, Carolyn Leigh) – 2:54
"It's Over, It's Over, It's Over" (Matt Dennis, Dick Stanford) – 2:42
"Old MacDonald Had a Farm" (Traditional, Alan Bergman, Marilyn Keith, Lew Spence) – 2:42
"This Was My Love" (Jim Harbert) – 3:28
"All My Tomorrows" (Cahn, Van Heusen) – 3:15
"Sleep Warm" (Bergman, Keith, Spence) – 2:43

Personnel
 Frank Sinatra - vocals
 Nelson Riddle - arranger, conductor

References

Albums produced by Dave Cavanaugh
1961 compilation albums
Frank Sinatra compilation albums
Capitol Records compilation albums
Albums conducted by Nelson Riddle
Albums arranged by Nelson Riddle
Albums recorded at Capitol Studios